Gianluca Maglia (born 12 December 1988) is a male Italian swimmer.

Maglia is an athlete of the Gruppo Sportivo Fiamme Oro.

Biography
In 2012, Maglia qualified for his first Olympic appearance in London 2012.

Achievements

On July 31, during the 2012 Summer Olympics in London, England he participated in the Men's 4 × 200 m Freestyle Relay Heat.  The team finished 6th, in a time of 7:12.69.

See also
Italy at the 2012 Summer Olympics - Swimming

References

External links
profile at Federnuoto website 
Swimmer profile at CONI website

1988 births
Living people
Italian male swimmers
Italian male freestyle swimmers
Sportspeople from Catania
Olympic swimmers of Italy
Swimmers at the 2012 Summer Olympics
European Aquatics Championships medalists in swimming
Mediterranean Games gold medalists for Italy
Mediterranean Games silver medalists for Italy
Swimmers at the 2009 Mediterranean Games
Swimmers at the 2013 Mediterranean Games
Mediterranean Games medalists in swimming
Universiade bronze medalists for Italy
Universiade medalists in swimming
Swimmers of Fiamme Oro
Medalists at the 2013 Summer Universiade